The Greek Rugby Federation or EOP is the former administrative body for rugby union  in Greece. The  Ministry of Culture and Sport withdrew Greek government recognition of the organisation in September 2014 due to the low number of active clubs participating in the sport.

History
EOP was founded in 2005, and became affiliated to Rugby Europe (then known as FIRA-AER) in June of that year. The organisation represented Greece as a member of World Rugby (previously known as IRB) from 2009, until the Greek government removed its administrative authority in 2014. Control and development of rugby was passed to the Hellenic Handball Federation which announced it would begin a series of friendly matches between existing clubs until enough teams were established to reinstate an official competitive league.

See also
Greece national rugby union team - men's national fifteen-a-side team.
Greek Championship Rugby Union - the main domestic rugby competition (2005 to 2013).

References

External links
Greek Rugby Federation - Official Site

Rugby union in Greece
Greece
Sports organizations established in 2005